The 1986 Auburn Tigers football team represented Auburn University in the 1986 NCAA Division I-A football season.  Coached by Pat Dye, the team finished the season with a 10–2 record. Auburn snapped a two-game winning streak by Alabama in the Iron Bowl.  Auburn went on to defeat USC in the Florida Citrus Bowl, 16–7.

Schedule

Personnel

Rankings

Game summaries

at No. 13 Mississippi State

at Florida

    
    
    
    
    
    

For most of the game, Auburn dominated coach Galen Hall's unranked Florida Gators at Florida Field. The Tigers defense was stifling, and forced Gators substitute quarterback Rodney Brewer to commit four turnovers in the first two quarters. Hall replaced Brewer with starting quarterback Kerwin Bell, who had missed two games with a knee injury. Tigers tailback Brent Fullwood gained 166 yards on the ground, including a second-quarter touchdown, to give Auburn a 17–0 lead early in the fourth quarter. Bell then led the Gators on two scoring drives, with Gators placekicker Robert McGinty—a transfer from Auburn—booting a 51-yard field goal to close the Tigers' advantage to 17−10 with 1:45 to play.  With thirty-six seconds remaining in the game, Bell directed one final 79-yard drive in ten plays that was capped by a five-yard touchdown pass to wide receiver Ricky Nattiel, who was playing with a separated shoulder. The limping Bell then surprised the Tigers defense by running in the two-point conversion and completing the comeback, with the Gators winning 18–17.

vs. USC (Florida Citrus Bowl)

References

Auburn
Auburn Tigers football seasons
Citrus Bowl champion seasons
Auburn Tigers football